Bells and whistles refers to non-essential features, visual or functional, that are an enhancement to an object.

It may also refer to:
 More Bells and Whistles, a 1990 computer animation created by Wayne Lytle
 Detana!! TwinBee, a 1991 coin-operated video game produced by Konami (released outside Japan as Bells & Whistles)
 "Bells and Whistles", a song by Andrew Jackson Jihad from the 2007 album People That Can Eat People Are the Luckiest People in the World
 "The Bells and Whistles", an episode of American TV series Smash